Countess Viktoria-Luise of Solms-Baruth (Christened as Countess Viktoria-Luise Friederike Karoline Mathilde of Solms-Baruth; 13 March 1921 – 1 March 2003) was a German noblewoman.

Early life
Countess Viktoria-Luise was born at Schloss Casel in Casel, Weimar Republic to Count Hans of Solms-Baruth and Princess Karoline Mathilde of Schleswig-Holstein-Sonderburg-Glücksburg. Her maternal grandparents were Friedrich Ferdinand, Duke of Schleswig-Holstein-Sonderburg-Glücksburg, and Princess Karoline Mathilde of Schleswig-Holstein-Sonderburg-Augustenburg.

Marriages
On 25 January 1942, Viktoria-Louise married her first cousin, Friedrich Josias, Prince of Saxe-Coburg and Gotha, at the Pfarr- und Patronatskirche Kasel. She and Friedrich Josias divorced on 19 September 1946. They had one child:
Andreas, Prince of Saxe-Coburg and Gotha (b. 21 March 1943).

She married, secondly, Richard Whitten on 6 November 1947 at Steinwänd bei Werfen, Austria. They were remarried in a religious ceremony on 14 February 1948 at San Francisco, California. They had one child:
Victoria Astrid Whitten (b. 23 August 1948).

Ancestry

References

External links
Victoria Louise Frederica Caroline Matildhe Gräfin zu Solms-Baruth profile, thepeerage.com; accessed 15 April 2014.

1921 births
2003 deaths
People from Dahme-Spreewald
Viktoria-Luise
Viktoria-Luise
Viktoria-Luise
Princesses by marriage
German emigrants to the United States